Bircumshaw is an English surname. Notable people with the surname include:

 Peter Bircumshaw (1938–2017), English footballer
 Tony Bircumshaw (born 1945), English footballer, brother of Peter

English-language surnames